Collectors is a 2020 South Korean heist caper story film directed by Park Jung-bae and produced by Hwang Dong-hyuk. The film starring Lee Je-hoon, Jo Woo-jin, Shin Hye-sun and Im Won-hee, tells the caper story of a grave robbery taking place in the heart of Seoul.

The film released on November 4, 2020, opened at top of local box office, as it sold about 80,000 tickets and grossed 701.6 million KRW (estimated US$626,916) on the opening day.

As of January 2, 2021, Collectors is at 13th place, with gross of US$12.43 million and 1.52 million admissions, among all the films released in South Korea in the year 2020.

Synopsis
Kang Dong-goo (Lee Je-hoon) is a genius robber with a unique touch and intuition. He works with antiquated burial place mural expert, Dr. Jones (Jo Woo-jin) and legendary shoveling master, Sapdari. Curator Yoon (Shin Hye-sun), an antiques expert, offers an appealing but daring heist idea to Kang Dong-goo.

Cast
 Lee Je-hoon as Kang Dong-goo, a genius robber with a unique touch and intuition.
 Jo Woo-jin as Dr. Jones, an expert in tomb mural robbery. 
 Shin Hye-sun as Yoon Se-hee, a curator.
 Im Won-hee as Shovel Leg, named after his legendary shoveling skills.
 Song Young-chang as Sang-gil
 Joo Jin-mo as Man-gi
 Lee Sung-wook as Gwang-chul 
 Park Se-wan as Hye-ri
 Park Jin-woo as Chief Oh

Production
In March 2019, Lee Je-hoon was confirmed to play the protagonist in the film. In May 2019, Shin Hye-sun's appearance was confirmed in the film.

Release
Collectors was invited at  Fantasia International Film Festival to screen the film. The three-week festivals was held from August 5 to 25, 2021 in Montreal. The film was screened in Canadian Premiere section on August 17, 2021.

Reception

Box office
The film released on November 4, 2020, opened at top of local box office, as it sold about 80,000 tickets and grossed 701.6 million  (around US$626,916). It remained no.1 film on Korean box office for consecutive three weeks from November 8 to November 22, 2020.

According to Korean Film Council data, it is at 11th place among all the Korean films released in the year 2020, with gross of US$12.15 million and 1.54 million admissions, as of January 3, 2021.

Critical response

Going by Korean review aggregator Naver Movie Database, the film holds an approval rating of 8.48 from the audience.

References

External links
 
 
 
 

2020 films
CJ Entertainment films
2020s Korean-language films
South Korean crime comedy films
South Korean heist films
Films set in Seoul
Films set in Yanbian
2020 comedy films